Wiremu is a masculine given name, the Māori form of William. Notable people with the name include:

People with given name Wiremu
 Aaron Wiremu Cruden (born 1989), New Zealand rugby union player
 Wiremu Doherty, New Zealand Māori educationalist and academic
 Sydney Wiremu Eru, (born 1971), New Zealand rugby league player
 Wiremu Gudgeon, New Zealand politician
 Rata Wiremu Harrison (1935–2013), New Zealand rugby league player
 Wiremu Heke (1894–1989), New Zealand rugby union player
 Hōne Wiremu Heke Pōkai (c.1807/08–1850), Maori chief and war leader
 Wiremu Hikairo (c.1780/90–1851), New Zealand tribal leader
 Hoani Wiremu Hīpango (c.1820–1865), New Zealand tribal leader
 Wiremu Hoani Taua (1862–1919), New Zealand tribal leader
 David Wiremu Houpapa (born 1981), New Zealand cricketer
 Wiremu Hukunui Manaia (?–1892), New Zealand tribal leader
 Wiremu Katene (?–1895), New Zealand politician
 Wiremu Kerei Nikora (1853–1915), member of the New Zealand Legislative Council
 Wiremu Kīngi (c.1795–1882), chief of the Te Āti Awa Tribe
 Wiremu Kīngi Maketū (c.1824–1842), the first person executed in New Zealand under British rule
 Wiremu Kingi Moki Te Matakatea (?–1893), New Zealand tribal warrior and leader
 Wiremu Maihi Te Rangikaheke (?–1896), New Zealand tribal leader and scholar
 Hamiora Wiremu Maioha (1888–1963), New Zealand interpreter and community leader
 Wiremu Neera Te Awaitaia (c.1796–1866), New Zealand Māori chief
 Wiremu Panapa (1898–1970), New Zealand Anglican Suffragan Bishop
 Wiremu Parata (c.1830s–1906), New Zealand politician
 Wiremu Paratene (1909–2001), New Zealand professional cyclist and politician
 Wiremu Patara Te Tuhi (?–1910), New Zealand tribal leader, newspaper editor, warrior and secretary to the Māori King
 Wiremu Pere (1837–1915), New Zealand Member of Parliament
 Sir Māui Wiremu Pita Naera Pōmare (1875/76–1930), New Zealand doctor and politician
 Wiremu Piti Pomare (?–1851), New Zealand Māori leader
 Tahupōtiki Wiremu Rātana (1873–1939), founder of the Rātana religion
 Winston Wiremu Reid (born 1988), New Zealand professional footballer
 Wiremu Rikihana (1851–1933), New Zealand tribal leader and politician
 Sir Mark Wiremu Solomon (born c.1954), Māori tribal leader
 Wiremu Tako Ngātata (1815–1887), New Zealand politician and Te Āti Awa leader
 Wiremu Tamihana (~1805–1866), leader of the Ngāti Hauā iwi
 Henare Wiremu Taratoa (c.1830–1864), New Zealand tribal missionary, teacher and war leader
 Wiremu Te Awhitu (1914–1994), the first Māori to be ordained a Roman Catholic priest
 Wiremu Te Kahui Kararehe (1846–1904), New Zealand tribal leader and historian
 Wiremu Te Koti Te Rato (1820–1895), New Zealand Wesleyan minister
 Wiremu Te Ranga Poutapu (1905–1975), New Zealand master carver and carpenter
 Wiremu Te Tau Huata (1917–1991), New Zealand Anglican priest and military chaplain
 Wiremu Te Wheoro (1826–1895), member of the New Zealand House of Representatives
 Wiremu Teihoka Parata (c.1879–1949), New Zealand rugby union administrator
 Hore Wiremu Waaka (c.1938–2014), New Zealand musical entertainer
 Wiremu Whareaitu (1912−1973), New Zealand swimmer

Fictional characters named Wiremu
 Wiremu Johnson, a character in the New Zealand radio soap opera You Me Now
 Wiremu Potae, a character in the New Zealand soap opera Shortland Street

See also
 William (name)

Māori language
Masculine given names